Sopuluchukwu Ezeonwuka  is a Nigerian Politician and was a member, Federal House of Representatives representing Orumba North/South Federal Constituency Anambra State in the 8th National Assembly and removed by the court in 2017

References 

Anambra State politicians
Living people
Year of birth missing (living people)